Caleb Azumah Nelson is a British-Ghanaian writer and photographer. His 2021 debut novel, Open Water, won the Costa Book Award for First Novel.

Personal life 
Azumah Nelson grew up in and currently lives in southeast London (Bellingham). For the first six years of his life, he lived with his maternal grandmother after she moved to London from Ghana, though she eventually returned to her home country. Although Azumah Nelson hopes to travel more and visit Ghana again, he intends to remain in Bellingham for most of his life.

Beyond writing and photography, Azumah Nelson played violin for ten years.

Azumah Nelson's dream to become an author began as a teenager. In 2019, after his godfather, aunt, and three of his grandparents died, he quit his job at Apple and began writing full time.

Photography 
Azumah Nelson began shooting using a film camera when he was around eighteen years old.

He believes his "writing and photography go hand in hand; they both act as sites of honest expression, and encourage me to think about how I see the world, how I move through it, how I love and express that love. When I’m confronted by the blank page, in a way, I’m confronting myself, who I am, all of the nuances which make me. There’s a freedom in affording myself or others this kind of space, to just be themselves, even if that’s for a brief moment."

In 2019, Azumah Nelson won the Palm* Photo People's Choice prize and was shortlisted for the Palm* Photo Prize.

Writing 
Azumah Nelson's writing has been published in Litro and The White Review.

His short story Pray was shortlisted for the BBC National Short Story Award (2020).

Although he is inspired by many artists, Azumah Nelson has stated that his primary role models are Zadie Smith, Lynette Yiadom-Boakye, Kendrick Lamar, Barry Jenkins, and his parents.

Open Water (2021) 

Azumah Nelson's debut novel, Open Water, was published on 4 February 2021 by Viking Press.

Short stories 
 A Little Unsteadily Into Light (2022, New Island Books)

References

External links 
 "We meet Lewisham's breakthrough novelist", Catford Chronicle, February 2021.* Lauren Christensen, "For Caleb Azumah Nelson, There’s Freedom in Feeling Seen", The New York Times, 7 April 2021.
 Killian Fox, "On my radar: Caleb Azumah Nelson’s cultural highlights", The Guardian, 12 February 2022.

Living people
21st-century British short story writers
21st-century British writers
21st-century Ghanaian writers
Black British photographers
Black British writers
British people of Ghanaian descent
Writers from London
Year of birth unknown
Year of birth missing (living people)